Sanxing railway station is a railway station located in Chuanshan District, Suining, Sichuan, People's Republic of China, on the Suiyu railway which is operated by China Railway Corporation.

Structure

Service

History
It was opened in 2006. It originally served passengers but it is now only used for freight.

Nearby station

Railway stations in Sichuan